In fluid dynamics the Eötvös number (Eo), also called the Bond number (Bo), is a dimensionless number 
measuring the importance of gravitational forces compared to surface tension forces for the movement of liquid front. Alongside the Capillary number, commonly denoted , which represents the contribution of viscous drag,  is useful for studying the movement of fluid in  porous or granular media, such as soil. The Bond number (or Eötvös number) is also used (together with Morton number) to characterize the shape of bubbles or drops moving in a surrounding fluid. The two names used for this dimensionless term commemorate the Hungarian physicist Loránd Eötvös (1848–1919) and the English physicist Wilfrid Noel Bond (1897–1937), respectively. The term Eötvös number is more frequently used in Europe, while Bond number is commonly used in other parts of the world.

Definition
Describing the ratio of gravitational to capillary forces, the Eötvös or Bond number is given by the equation:

 : difference in density of the two phases, (SI units: kg/m3)
 g: gravitational acceleration, (SI units : m/s2)
 L: characteristic length, (SI units : m) (for example the radii of curvature for a drop)
 : surface tension, (SI units : N/m)

The Bond number can also be written as

where  is the capillary length.

A high value of the Eötvös or Bond number indicates that the system is relatively unaffected by surface tension effects; a low value (typically less than one) indicates that surface tension dominates. Intermediate numbers indicate a non-trivial balance between the two effects. It may be derived in a number of ways, such as scaling the pressure of a drop of liquid on a solid surface. It is usually important, however, to find the right length scale specific to a problem by doing a ground-up scale analysis. Other similar dimensionless numbers are:

where Go and De are the Goucher and Deryagin numbers, which are identical: the Goucher number arises in wire coating problems and hence uses a radius as a typical length scale while the Deryagin number arises in plate film thickness problems and hence uses a Cartesian length.

In order to consider all three of the forces that act on a moving fluid front in the presence of a gas (or other fluid) phase, namely viscous, capillary and gravitational forces, the generalized Bond number, which is denoted commonly as Bo*, can be used. This is defined as:

References

Dimensionless numbers of fluid mechanics
Bubbles (physics)
Fluid dynamics